Institute of Nuclear Physics may refer to:

 Albanian Institute of Nuclear Physics
 Budker Institute of Nuclear Physics, Russia
 Max Planck Institute for Nuclear Physics, Germany
 Nuclear Physics Institute of the Czech Academy of Sciences
 Saha Institute of Nuclear Physics, India
 Pakistan Institute of Nuclear Physics, Pakistan